Rangpur is one of the major cities in Bangladesh and Rangpur Division. Rangpur was declared a district headquarters on December 16, 1769, and established as a municipality in 1869, making it one of the oldest municipalities in Bangladesh. The municipal office building was erected in 1892 under the precedence Raja Janaki Ballav, Senior Chairman of the municipality. In 1890, the Shyamasundari canal was excavated for the improvement of the town. Sharfuddin Ahmed Jhantu was first mayor of Rangpur City Corporation. Now Rangpur City Corporation is the 2nd largest city corporation in Bangladesh. it's about 205 square kilometres. Rangpur is famous for Shataranji, Haribhanga (mango), Rangpur (fruit) and tobacco. Rangpur is called Baher Desh.

Rangpur, a city of history and heritage is located in the northwestern part of Bangladesh. Begum Rokeya University and Rangpur Cadet College are situated in the southern part of the city. Previously, Rangpur was the headquarters of the Greater Rangpur district. Later, the Greater Rangpur district was broken down into the Gaibandha, Kurigram, Lalmonirhat, Nilphamari and Rangpur districts. In the greater Rangpur region, little economic development took place until the 1990s, mainly because of the yearly flooding the region used to see before the building of the Teesta Barrage. Coal is found near this district. There is a large military cantonment in the vicinity of the city, along with a Ghagot park (under military surveillance), in addition to the famous Carmichael College Tajhat Palace, Ciklee water park and Rangpur Zoo in the city. Rangpur is also famous for its handicrafts industry like Shataranji which is recently declared as a GI product of Bangladesh.

History

Etymology 
It is said that the present name Rangpur came from the former 'Rongpur'. History has it that English colonial rulers in this region started cultivating Indigo. Due to the fertile soil in this region, Indigo cultivation was very much profitable. The locals knew that Indigo by the name of "Rongo". So thus, this Region was named "Rongopur".And from that, the name of today's Rangpur has originated. It is known from another conventional notion that the name Rangpur comes from the naming of Rangmahal (Palace of Entertainment) of Bhagadatta, son of Narakasura, king of Pragjyotisha Kingdom.

Early History 
According to Hindu theology, the eastern kingdom of Kamarupa or Pragjyotisha existed in India, which included the present Rangpur region. During the reign of King Bhagadatta (15th century BC) Rangpur belonged to Pragjyotisha Kingdom. During the reign of King Samudragupta (340 AD) Rangpur was considered a "Tax state" of Kamarupa.

Mughal Period 
According to Ain-i-Akbari, the Mughal period Rangpur consisted of three types of administrative areas. Rangpur was conquered by the army of Raja Man Singh, a commander of the Mughal emperor Akbar, in 1575, but it was not until 1686 it was fully integrated into the Mughal Empire. The Mughal Empire was established in the whole of Rangpur in 1611 AD. Place names Mughalbasa ("a locality of the Mughals"), and Mughalhat ("local market") organized by the Mughals bear testimony to the Mughal association and past of Rangpur and its hinterland. Later, Rangpur passed into the control of Sarker of Ghoraghat.

British Period 
After the East India Company gained "Deoani"  in 1765, Rangpur came under British rule. The Fakir-Sannyasi rebellion took place in the Rangpur region, in which leaders like Fakir Majnu Shah played a key Role. The notable anti-colonialist rebel Devi Chaudhurani  and Bhabani Pathak were from this region. In the Sepoy Mutiny of 1857, the rebellious sepoys spread terror among the British rulers in the region. Later, in 1930, the first Civil disobedience movement was started in different parts of Rangpur on the call of Congress. A meeting of the peasant leaders of North Bengal was held here in October 1946 and the Tebhaga movement began in November.

Pakistani Period and Liberation War 
Rangpur was a District of East Pakistan Province during the Pakistani Period. People of Rangpur actively take part in different movements like Bengali language movement, Six point movement and 1969 Mass uprising. The first martyr from Rangpur in the liberation war was Sangku Samajhder, who was martyred on the date of 3 March 1971. Rangpur people started the Liberation War decisively on 28 March 1971, only three days after the Pakistani crackdown by attacking the Rangpur Cantonment. During the liberation war Rangpur was under sector 6 and it was strategically important due to its close proximity to border of India.

Post-Independence Period 
The Greater Rangpur district was divided in five districts in 1984. On 28 June 2012 Rangpur Municipality was upgraded to Rangpur City Corporation and on 16 September 2018 Rangpur was granted as 8th Metropolitan city of Bangladesh.

Geography
Rangpur City is the divisional headquarters of Rangpur Division. The soil composition is mainly alluvial soil (80 percent) of the Teesta River basin, and the remaining is barind soil. The elevation of Rangpur is 34 meters. The temperature ranges from 32 degrees Celsius to 11 degrees Celsius, and the annual rainfall averages 2931 mm. Rangpur town, covering an area of around 42 square kilometers, lies on the bank of the Ghaghat river and was turned into a municipality back in 1869.

Climate 
Rangpur has a humid subtropical climate (Köppen Cwa), also in Trewartha climate classification (subtropical summer wet Cw). The 4 Seasons of Rangpur generally characterize as a Summer or pre-monsoon season with high Temperature and frequent intense thunderstorms named Nor'westers (March–May), an intense and very wet Monsoon season with substantial flooding in low lying areas (June–September), short and cooler Autumn season (October–November) and lastly, the more pleasant, mild and drier Winter season from (December–February) with warm afternoons and cool mornings, with some cold nights. About  of precipitation falls annually, almost all of them falls in the monsoon season (June to September), although there is very little rain from November to March, but small amount of Precipitation can be seen due to Western Disturbance coming from the Mediterranean Sea. Snow and frost have never been recorded in Rangpur.

Economy 

The city is the commercial hub. Its center has several government offices and private banks, insurance companies, residential hotels, and international restaurants, such as Chinese, Thai, Indian, Mexican, convenience food, and gift shops. It is one of the most important economic zones in Bangladesh because of its global positioning. Rangpur is one of the major Tobacco producing region in Bangladesh. The northern suburbs of Rangpur homes to tobacco companies like British American Tobacco, Akij Group, Abul Khair Group.

Demographics 

The total population of Rangpur city corporation is 796,556. Among them, 398,282 are male and 398,274 are female. The literacy rate in Rangpur is 65%.

Education 

Major educational institutes in the city including:

Universities
 Begum Rokeya University

Medical and dental colleges

 Rangpur Medical College
 Prime Medical College
Rangpur Community Medical College
 Northern Private Medical College.
 Rangpur Army Medical College
 Kasir Uddin Memorial Medical College
Rangpur Dental College

Polytechnic institutes

 Rangpur Polytechnic Institute
 Rangpur Technical School and College

Colleges

Begum Rokeya College
Rangpur Engineering College
 Carmichael College
 Dr M A Wazed Miah Textile Engineering College
 Pirganj Marine Academy
 Collectorate School and College
 Carmichael Collegiate School and College
 Rangpur Model College
 Police Lines School and College
 Rangpur Cadet College
 Cantonment Public School And College, Rangpur
 BIAM Model School And College, Rangpur
 Rangpur Technical School and College
 Rangpur Government College
 RCCI Public School & College
 Lions School & College
 The Millennium Stars School & College
 Somaj Kolyan Women School & College
 Residential Model School and College
 Mahigong College
 Rangpur Public School and College
 Uttom College
 Rangpur City College
 Robertsonganj High School & College
 Robertsonganj Girls' High School & College
 Siddique Memorial School & College
 Dhap Lalkuthi High School & College

Affiliated colleges
 International Institute of Applied Science and Technology, Rangpur

Schools

 Cantonment Public School And College, Rangpur
 Rangpur Zilla School
 Rangpur Govt. Girls' High School
 Govt. Commercial Institute
 Bir Uttam Shaheed Samad High School
 Rangpur High School
 Salma Girls High School
 Afanullah High School, Alamnagar
 Adasha High School, Babukha
 Shalbon Pauro Girls High School
 Tajhat High School

English medium schools

 The Millennium Stars School & College
 Shahan International School
 Nalanda International School
 International Grammar School
 BIAM Laboratory School

Neighbourhoods 

Rangpur City Corporation is divided into 33 wards and different neighbourhoods (Mahallah), which can be categorized as Urban and Suburban.

Burirhat
Chabbis Hazari
Panadardighi
Uttam
Hazirhat
CO Bazar
Dhap
Kellabond
Radhaballov
Shimulbag-Sagarpara
Keranipara
Munshipara
Lalkuthi lane
Khalifapara
Jummapara
Jahaj Company
Nababgonj
Betpotti-Taltola
Kotkipara
Parjantan Para
Modern
Ashratpur
Alamnagar
Robertsonganj
Darshana
Lalbagh
Khamarpara
Islampur
Pirjabad
Parbatipur
Mahiganj
Tajhat
Ganeshpur
Babukha
DC More
Adarshapara
Mistry Para

Transport

Road 

Rangpur is well connected by highways to Chittagong and Dhaka, as well as other parts of Rangpur. It takes about 6 to 7 hours by road to reach the capital Dhaka by National Highway 5. Bus services to other major districts are also available from Rangpur. Highway links to India have been established through the Asian Highway 2. Rangpur also has a BRTC Double Decker bus service, which connects the suburbs of the city to city center.

Railway

The Rangpur Railway Station is the main railway station providing trains on national routes operated by the state-run Bangladesh Railway. The Rangpur Express is a Bangladeshi Intercity train which runs between Rangpur and Dhaka. Other trains running between Rangpur and Dhaka are, Kurigram Express and Lalmoni Express.

Air
The city of Rangpur is served by Saidpur Airport, located at the north of the city. Saidpur airport is a domestic airport. Saidpur Airport is connected through several private airlines such as Novoair, US-Bangla Airlines, Regent Airways & Biman Bangladesh Airlines a government airline with Capital city of Bangladesh Dhaka. A massive renovation work is going on at Saidpur Airport ahead of its planning to become the new International Airport for Northern Bangladesh region.

Places of interest 

 Tajhat Palace
 Rangpur Zoo
 Chikli vata Lake
 Collectorate Surovi Park
 Rangpur Town Hall
 Shrine of Maulana Karamat Ali Jaunpuri RA.
 Carmichael College
Vinnojagat Amusement Park
Devi Chowdhurani's palace
Nine-domed mosque
Pigeon closure
Attempts Army Amusement Park

Sports

The most popular sport in Rangpur is cricket, although football is also popular. There is a 10,000-capacity Rangpur Stadium is used for football and other sports. Another local stadium is Cricket Garden, which is mainly used for cricket. There are also a few sports training academies in the city. In domestic Twenty20 cricket, Rangpur has a Bangladesh Premier League franchise known as Rangpur Riders. In December 2012, I Sports bought the Rangpur franchise for $1.01 m. Notable players from Rangpur who have played for the national team include Nasir Hossain, Suhrawadi Shuvo.

Notable people

Gallery

References

External links

 Rangpur City Corporation
 Rangpur oriented website
 

 
Populated places in Rangpur Division